Rocky Island (North) Conservation Park is a protected area in the Australian state of South Australia associated with North Rocky Island which is located off the west coast of Eyre Peninsula in South Australia about  north northwest of Coffin Bay.  The conservation park which had been declared as Fauna Conservation Reserve in March 1967, was re-proclaimed in 1972 under the National Parks and Wildlife Act 1972 to ‘conserve seal haulout areas and associated island habitat.’  The conservation park is classified as an International Union for Conservation of Nature (IUCN) Category Ia protected area.

References

External links
Rocky Island (North) Conservation Park webpage on protected planet

Conservation parks of South Australia
Protected areas established in 1967
1967 establishments in Australia
South Australian terrestrial protected areas with a marine zone